William Bevin Keith Hough (21 April 1929 – 25 November 2019) was a New Zealand sportsman who represented New Zealand in rugby league and the long jump.

Early life and family
Hough was born on 21 April 1929 in the Auckland suburb of Ponsonby, the son of William Hough of Wiri.

Athletics career
Representing Auckland, Hough won the 1948 New Zealand under-19 long jump title, jumping .

At the 1950 British Empire Games in Auckland Hough leapt  to win the silver medal in the men's long jump.

Rugby league career
Hough played rugby league for the Richmond and Papakura clubs. He represented both Auckland and New Zealand, being selected for the Kiwis from 1950 to 1953 and playing in 12 test matches. During the 1951 French rugby league tour of Australia and New Zealand, Hough was selected to play for both Auckland and New Zealand at winger.

Death
Hough died in Tauranga on 25 November 2019 at the age of 90.

References

1929 births
2019 deaths
New Zealand male long jumpers
Commonwealth Games silver medallists for New Zealand
Commonwealth Games medallists in athletics
Athletes (track and field) at the 1950 British Empire Games
New Zealand rugby league players
New Zealand national rugby league team players
Richmond Bulldogs players
Auckland rugby league team players
Papakura Sea Eagles players
Rugby league wingers
Medallists at the 1950 British Empire Games